C'mon Let's Pretend is the debut studio album of Swedish rock group Sahara Hotnights, originally released in 1999. It went on to win two Grammis.

Track listing 
 "Push on Some More" – 3:34
 "Quite a Feeling" – 3:44
 "Drive Dead Slow" – 3:40
 "Oh Darling!" – 3:37
 "Wake Up" – 3:31
 "That's What They Do" – 4:36
 "Impressed by Me" – 2:48
 "Kicks" – 3:28
 "Too Cold for You" – 2:41
 "I Know Exactly What to Do" – 4:48
 "Our Very Own" – 5:07

Personnel
Maria Andersson  – lead vocals, guitar
Jennie Asplund  –  guitar, backing vocals
Johanna Asplund  –  bass, backing vocals
Josephine Forsman  – drums

References

1999 debut albums
Sahara Hotnights albums